Kazansky Bridge is a bridge across Griboyedov Canal in Saint Petersburg, Russia. From 1766 to 1830, it had the name Rozhdestvensky Bridge and from 1923 to 1944—Plekhanov Bridge. It is located near the Kazan Cathedral (hence the name). It is second-widest bridge in St. Petersburg after the Blue Bridge, the lowest bridge in the city and therefore also the only bridge where sailing underneath it is prohibited.

The bridge was built in 1765–1766 in place of previously existed wooden Rozhdenstvensky Bridge (since 1716) which was demolished during granite embankment of Griboyedov Canal.

References
saint-petersburg.com

Bridges in Saint Petersburg
Bridges completed in 1766
Nevsky Prospekt
Cultural heritage monuments of federal significance in Saint Petersburg